Page includes discography releases as Nico & Vinz and earlier releases as Envy

Norwegian singing and songwriting duo Nico & Vinz has released two studio albums, fourteen singles and one mixtape.

The duo was launched as Envy with its main debut appearance at Emergenza Festival in 2011. They won first place at the Taubertal Open Air Festival World's "Emergenza Final" for new emerging artists. Following that success, the duo released the mixtape Dreamworks: Why Not Me under the name Envy. The materials were also made available online through WiMP. In June 2011, the duo released their debut single "One Song" under the name Envy. The song peaked to number 19 on the Norwegian Singles Chart. Envy released their debut studio album The Magic Soup and the Bittersweet Faces on April 27, 2012, peaking to number 37 on the Norwegian Albums Chart.

In April 2013, they released "Am I Wrong" under the name Envy. In January 2014, the duo changed their name from Envy to Nico & Vinz, in coordination with their signing to Warner Bros. Records in the United States to avoid being confused with other artists with a similar name. With international success of the single, the duo changed the credits of the single to the new adopted name. In August 2014, the song gained them their first UK number one single, and they became the first Norwegian act to top the chart in 28 years. The song also peaked at number one in New Zealand and at number 2 on the Norwegian Singles Chart, Danish Singles Chart and on the Swedish Singles Chart. It was followed up with another release "In Your Arms" which also charted in Norway, Denmark and Sweden.

Albums

Studio albums

Mixtapes

Extended plays

Singles

As lead artist

As featured artist

Notes
 Credited as Envy.
 Credited originally to Envy until renaming of the duo as Nico & Vinz in January 2014. International releases starting February 2014 were changed to Nico & Vinz as well and Scandinavian charts were amended to reflect change.
 Credited as Nico & Vinz.

Other charted songs

Notes

References

Pop music discographies
Discographies of Norwegian artists